In enzymology, a Goodpasture-antigen-binding protein kinase is an enzyme that catalyzes the chemical reaction

ATP + Goodpasture antigen-binding protein  ADP + [Goodpasture antigen-binding phosphoprotein]

Thus, the two substrates of this enzyme are ATP and Goodpasture antigen-binding protein, whereas its two products are ADP and Goodpasture antigen-binding phosphoprotein.

This enzyme belongs to the family of transferases, specifically those transferring a phosphate group to the sidechain oxygen atom of serine or threonine residues in proteins (protein-serine/threonine kinases). The systematic name of this enzyme class is ATP:[Goodpasture antigen-binding protein] phosphotransferase. Other names in common use include GPBPK, GPBP kinase, STK11, and Goodpasture antigen-binding protein kinase. This enzyme participates in mTOR signaling pathway and adipocytokine signaling pathway.

References

 
 

EC 2.7.11
Enzymes of unknown structure